Mickey and the Seal is a cartoon short created by Walt Disney in 1948. It was nominated for Academy Award for Best Animated Short Film, but lost to MGM's Tom and Jerry cartoon The Little Orphan, which shared one of seven Oscars for the Tom and Jerry series. It was the 122nd short in the Mickey Mouse film series to be released, and the second produced that year.

Plot
Mickey Mouse visits the seal exhibit at a zoo. He makes the seals perform tricks by feeding them fish. One young seal escapes from the exhibit to get more fish and ends up inside Mickey's basket. Mickey takes the basket home, where Pluto is begging for food. When Mickey puts the basket down, Pluto goes to investigate, but is hit on the nose by the seal's flippers. Pluto tries to tell Mickey what happened, but Mickey can't understand him. While this is happening, the seal escapes from the basket and Pluto chases it, only to get his head stuck inside the basket. He blunders around and, in the process, makes a mess of the kitchen, alerting Mickey. He angrily orders Pluto out of the house, despite Pluto's attempts to tell him what he was chasing.

When Mickey goes to the bathroom to take a bath, he doesn't notice the seal hop into the tank just before him. Completely unaware of what's around him, Mickey ends up scrubbing the seal's head with his brush instead of his back, which he intended to clean. Mickey eventually realizes that he's not scrubbing himself, but still can't see the seal behind him. The seal then begins scrubbing Mickey's head, which makes Mickey puzzled. Pluto later comes to the window and tries to tell Mickey again, but Mickey shuts the shade. When the seal takes his scrubbing brush, Mickey tries to get it back, only to grab the seal by mistake; he yells with fright upon seeing it. After jumping out of the tub, Mickey grabs a stool to nab the intruder, drains the water, and only then does he realize there is a seal in the tub.

Despite Mickey's orders to stay outside, an angry Pluto storms in and crashes into the tub, and then tries to attack the seal after Mickey introduces him to it. After Pluto becomes alarmed and angry when Mickey says he decides to keep it as a pet, Mickey changes his mind, understanding that Pluto won't like it and that having a wild animal for a pet is a bad idea, and eventually decides to take the seal back to the zoo, and Pluto smiles in reply (taking a liking to that idea) before bringing over Mickey's basket. After Mickey and Pluto drop it off, the seal shows the other seals the things it learned about bathtime from Mickey and Pluto. When Mickey comes home, he and Pluto find that all the seals have moved into their house and are using the bathroom and bathtub as their personal exhibit and pool, respectively, and using an ironing board as a diving board.

The young seal then waves goodbye from the shower, which concludes the cartoon.

Cast
Ford Banes as Mickey Mouse
James MacDonald as Pluto
Pinto Colvig as Pluto

Releases
 1948 – theatrical release
 1956 – Disneyland, episode #3.11: "At Home with Donald Duck" (TV)
 1968 – Walt Disney's Wonderful World of Color, episode #15.11: "The Mickey Mouse Anniversary Show"
 c. 1983 – Good Morning, Mickey!, episode #38 (TV)
 c. 1989 – Cheetah, re-release
 c. 1992 – Mickey's Mouse Tracks, episode #45 (TV)
 c. 1992 – Donald's Quack Attack, episode #36 (TV)
 c. 2000 – Walt Disney World TVs (TV)
 2002 – House of Mouse, episode #2.9: "King Larry Swings In" (TV)
 2009 – Have a Laugh!, episode #1 (TV)

Home media
The short was released on May 18, 2004 on Walt Disney Treasures: Mickey Mouse in Living Color, Volume Two: 1939-Today.

Additional releases include:
 1983 – "Cartoon Classics: Disney's Best of 1931-1948" (VHS)
 1988 – "Cartoon Classics: Special Edition" (VHS)
 1998 – "The Spirit of Mickey" (VHS)
 2006 – "Funny Factory with Mickey" (DVD)
 2010 – "Have a Laugh! Volume One" (DVD)

See also
Mickey Mouse (film series)

References

External links
 

1948 short films
1948 animated films
1948 comedy films
1940s English-language films
Mickey Mouse short films
Films set in zoos
1940s Disney animated short films
Films produced by Walt Disney
Films scored by Oliver Wallace
Films directed by Charles August Nichols
American comedy short films
Films about pinnipeds
American animated short films
RKO Pictures short films
RKO Pictures animated short films
Animated films about mice
Animated films about dogs